Randen may refer to:

 Randen (mountain range), in Switzerland and Germany
 Randen, a tram line of the Keifuku Electric Railroad in Japan

See also
 Randens